Anne Bourlioux is a Canadian mathematician whose research involves the numerical simulation of turbulent combustion.  She is a winner of the Richard C. DiPrima Prize, and a professor of mathematics and statistics at the Université de Montréal.

She is also a former rugby player for the Berkeley All Blues, and a
Canadian national champion and world record holder in indoor rowing.

Education
Bourlioux earned her Ph.D. in 1991 at Princeton University. Her dissertation, Numerical Studies of Unstable Detonations, was supervised by Andrew Majda. She was a Miller Research Fellow at the University of California, Berkeley from 1991 to 1993.

Academic recognition
Bourlioux won the Richard C. DiPrima Prize in 1992.
She was a keynote speaker at the 2006 Spring Technical Meeting of the Combustion Institute/Canadian Section, speaking on multiscale modeling of turbulent combustion.

Selected publications

References

Year of birth missing (living people)
Living people
Canadian mathematicians
Women mathematicians
Princeton University alumni
Academic staff of the Université de Montréal
Canadian female rowers